Grant Lake is a lake in Douglas County, in the U.S. state of Minnesota.

Grant Lake was named for Noah Grant, a pioneer who settled nearby in 1858.

See also
List of lakes in Minnesota

References

Lakes of Minnesota
Lakes of Douglas County, Minnesota